The Brisbane Blitz are an Australian junior ice hockey team based in Brisbane, Queensland playing in the second tier of the Australian Junior Ice Hockey League referred to as AJIHL Tier 2. They represent the first junior ice hockey team from Queensland as part of the proposed 2nd expansion of the AJIHL, which is the most elite level for ice hockey at a national level for ages between 16–20 years old.

Team history
At the beginning of the 2015–16 AJIHL season, a proposal for the next expansion in the AJIHL was made by Ice Hockey Australia to include teams from the Australian states of Queensland and South Australia and the Australian Capital Territory. A Wild Card entry was created in the AJIHL playoffs structure but no further public information would be made available for months but plans to form junior teams in each of these states was underway.

On 2 September 2015 a public announcement was made via the Southern Stars Ice Hockey of the decision to include a Queensland team as part of a new AJIHL Tier 2 competition. The first proposed games were to take place in Sydney on 5–6 December 2015. The team would undergo a 4-week training and development clinic, at the Acacia Ridge ice rink, run by Con Dionissiou (Ice Hockey Queensland President) and Darryl Dunsford (Southern Stars President) in September 2015.

The Brisbane Blitz began by playing their first exhibition game under the name Brisbane AJIHL at 5:15 pm on 12 December 2015 against a Brisbane All Stars team consisting of Southern Stars Ice Hockey players and Boondall Buccaneers players. The game was played at Iceworld Olympic Ice Rink in Boondall.

The Brisbane Blitz played in Canberra at the first AJIHL Tier 2 tournament in January 2016 against Canberra Junior Brave and Adelaide Generals. The Blitz won this tournament and therefore were selected as a Wild Card in the Tier 1 Finals which are being held 27–28 February 2016.

On 20 November 2016 the Brisbane Blitz team was selected for the 2016-17 AJIHL season, where the team would join regular season competition for the first time. Blitz goaltender Imogen Perry became the first female to play in the Australian Junior Ice Hockey League on 17 December 2016. The 16-year-old faced 38 shots on goal against the previous years champion Sydney Sabres, winning 7 – 1 in her debut.

The first team in club history:

Players

Captains
 2015–16 Mitchell Henning (C), Luke Moore (A), Harley Anderson (A)
 2016–17 Mitchell Henning (C), Matthew Gilpin (A), Harley Anderson (A)

Head coaches
The first Head Coach for the Brisbane Blitz was Con Dionissiou.

 2015–16 Con Dionissiou
 2016–17 Darryl Dunsford

See also

Australian Junior Ice Hockey League
Melbourne Glaciers
Melbourne Whalers
Perth Pelicans
Sydney Sabres
Sydney Wolf Pack
Ice Hockey Australia
Ice Hockey New South Wales
Australian Women's Ice Hockey League
Australian Ice Hockey League
Jim Brown Trophy
Goodall Cup
Joan McKowen Memorial Trophy

References

Australian Junior Ice Hockey League
Ice hockey teams in Australia
Sporting clubs in Brisbane
2015 establishments in Australia
Ice hockey clubs established in 2015